The Scandinavian College of Neuropsychopharmacology (SCNP) is a Nordic psychopharmacology organisation. The SCNP publishes the journal, Acta Neuropsychiatrica.

External links 
 

Universities and colleges in Denmark
Psychopharmacology